The 1953 East Texas State Lions football team was an American football team that represented East Texas State Teachers College—now known as Texas A&M University–Commerce–as a member of the Lone Star Conference (LSC) during the 1953 college football season. Led by Milburn Smith in his third and final season as head coach, the Lions compiled an overall record of 10–0–1 with a mark of 5–0 in conference play, winning the LSC title. East Texas State was invited to the Tangerine Bowl, where they tied Arkansas State.

Schedule

References

East Texas State
Texas A&M–Commerce Lions football seasons
Lone Star Conference football champion seasons
College football undefeated seasons
East Texas State Lions football